Allos gia to ekatommyrio (Somebody for a Millionaire) is a 1964 Greek comedy film directed by Orestis Laskos and written by Nikos Tsiforos and starring Mimis Fotopoulos, Giannis Gkionakis, Beata Assimakopoulou, Vassilis Avlonitis and Eleni Anoussaki.

Plot

Until some jokingly honest employee holds his bill for his friend for a millionaire without any directions.  The problems started when his friend died in an air crash and the honest employee (Mimis Fotopoulos) prepared to return for much to the lawful inheritance.

Cast
Mimis Fotopoulos as Savvas
Vasilis Avlonitis as Babis
Giannis Gkionakis as Kokos
Eleni Anousaki as Nelli
Stavros Paravas as Stratos
Beata Assimakopoulou as Anna
Giorgos Kappis as Aristidis Fysekis
Katerina Gioulaki as Loulou
Marika Krevata as Matina
Betty Moschona as Loukidou
Periklis Christoforidis as Karpidis
Dimitris Mavrommatis as Jim
Giorgos Velentzas as Vangelis
Nassos Kedrakas as Charilaos

External links
 

1964 films
1960s Greek-language films
1964 comedy films
Films directed by Orestis Laskos
Finos Film films
Greek comedy films